Henry Augustin Beers (1847–1926) was an author, literary historian, poet, and professor at Yale University.

Beers practiced law and worked as tutor before joining the Yale Department of English in 1875, where he produced numerous works, including scholarly studies of literature, volumes of poetry, and biographies. He is probably best known for his works on the historical development of literature.

Works
 A Century of American Literature, 1776-1876 (1877)
 Odds and Ends: Verses Humorous, Occasional and Miscellaneous (1878)
 Split Zephyr (1883)
 Readings From Ruskin: Italy (1885)
 Nathaniel Parker Willis (1885)
 The Thankless Muse (1885)
 An Outline Sketch of English Literature (1886)
 From Chaucer to Tennyson (1890)
 Initial Studies in American Letters (1891)
 A Suburban Pastoral, and Other Tales (1894)
 The Ways of Yale in the Counselship of Plancus (1895)
 A History of English Romanticism in the Eighteenth Century (1898)
 Points at Issue and Some Other Points (1903)
 A Short History of American Literature (1906)
 Milton's Tercentenary (1910)
 The Two Twilights (1917)
 Four Americans: Roosevelt, Hawthorne, Emerson, Whitman (1919)
 The Connecticut Wits, and Other Essays'' (1920)

References

External links
 
 
 
 
 

1847 births
1926 deaths
19th-century American writers
Yale University faculty
Writers from Buffalo, New York
20th-century American non-fiction writers
American literary historians
American male poets
19th-century American male writers
20th-century American male writers
American male non-fiction writers
Historians from New York (state)